The Boy in Me is an album by the American singer/guitarist Glen Campbell, released in 1994. It is an album of Christian music.

Track listing

 "The Boy in Me" (Kevin Stokes, Geoff Thurman) – (4:37)
 "Living the Legacy" (Lowell Alexander, Geoff Thurman) – (4:18)
 "Where Time Stands Still" (Shawn Craig, Geoff Thurman)  – (4:21)
 "Call It Even" (Kim Patton, Becky Thurman, Geoff Thurman) – (3:40)
 "Come Harvest Time" (Lowell Alexander) – (3:58)
 "The Best Is Yet to Come" (Robert Noland, Paul Smith, Geoff Thurman) – (4:22)
 "Something to Die For" (Dave Clark, Michael Puryear, Geoff Thurman)  – (4:03)
 "Mercy's Eyes" (Mark Hauth, Geoff Thurman) – (4:06)
 "All I Need Is You" (Ty Lacy, Geoff Thurman) – (4:26)
 "Amazing Grace" (John Newton; Arr. by Geoff Thurman) – (4:15)

Personnel
Glen Campbell – vocals, acoustic guitar, bagpipes
Geoff Thurman – backing vocals, keyboards, acoustic guitar, synth bass, percussion programming
Tom Hemby – acoustic guitar and electric guitar
Jackie Street – bass guitar
Cliff Downs – drums/percussion
Strings – Nashville String Machine
Background vocals – Cliff Downs, Mike Eldred, Mara Gail Getz, Michael Mellett, Cheryl Rogers

Production
Producers – Ronnie Brookshire, Cliff Downs, Geoff Thurman
Engineers – Ron Brookshire, Otto D'Angolo, Cliff Downs, Ashley Hydrick, Doug Sarrett, SouperDave Dillbeck
Art direction – Doug Knopp/Powell Creative Group
Recorded and mixed at North Beach Studios, Franklin, TN
Mastering by Ken Love at Master Mis Studios, Nashville, TN

Charts
Singles – CCM charts (United States)

References

Glen Campbell albums
1994 albums